Gerald Melzer was the defending champion but chose not to defend his title.

Guido Pella won the title after defeating Facundo Argüello 6–2, 6–4 in the final.

Seeds

Draw

Finals

Top half

Bottom half

References
Main Draw
Qualifying Draw

Claro Open Floridablanca - Singles
2017 Singles